is a former Japanese football player. He played for Japan national team.

Club career
Koshida was born in Kanazawa on October 19, 1960. After graduating from University of Tsukuba, he joined Nissan Motors in 1983. The club won 1983 and 1985 Emperor's Cup. In 1988-89 season, although the club won JSL Cup and Emperor's Cup, he left the club later in the season. In 1990, he returned his local and joined Japanese Regional Leagues club Kanazawa SC. He retired in 1996.

National team career
In August 1979, when Koshida was a University of Tsukuba student, he was selected by the Japan U-20 national team for the 1979 World Youth Championship and played in three matches. In December 1980, he was selected by the Japan national team for the 1982 World Cup qualification. At this qualification, on December 22, he debuted against Singapore. He played at the 1982 Asian Games, 1984 Summer Olympics qualification, and the 1986 World Cup qualification. He played 19 games for Japan until 1985.

Club statistics

National team statistics

References

External links
 
 
 Japan National Football Team Database

1960 births
Living people
University of Tsukuba alumni
Association football people from Ishikawa Prefecture
Japanese footballers
Japan youth international footballers
Japan international footballers
Japan Soccer League players
Yokohama F. Marinos players
Footballers at the 1982 Asian Games
Association football defenders
Asian Games competitors for Japan